Miklós Kovács (Prekmurje Slovene: Mikloš Kovač) (November 24, 1857 – November 23, 1937) was a Hungarian Slovene cantor and writer.

Born was in Šalovci (Prekmurje) in Vas County of the Kingdom of Hungary. His parents were Mihály Kováts and Rozália Kováts. Although he was primarily engaged in farming, he also wrote songs, mostly religious ones. His hymnal was lost over time, as was the hymnal of his collaborator József Konkolics. János Zsupánek preserved some of their songs.

Konkolics and Kovács subsidized the publication of Zsupánek's book Mrtvecsne peszmi (Dirges) in 1910.

He died in Veliki Šalovci in the Kingdom of Yugoslavia.

See also 
 List of Slovene writers and poets in Hungary
 Mihály Zsupánek

References 
 Slovenski biografski leksikon

1857 births
1937 deaths
People from Šalovci
Slovenian writers and poets in Hungary